Etah is a municipality city which is also the headquarters of Etah District of the Uttar Pradesh state in India. Etah district is a part of the Aligarh Division and is located at the midpoint of the Delhi-Kanpur Highway (NH 91) known as GT Road. The nearest big cities are Aligarh and Agra.

History
The city lies in the cultural region of Braj and was a part of the Surasena Mahajanapada during the Vedic Age. It was later ruled by the bigger kingdoms like the Mauryas, Guptas, Scythians, Kushans and Indo-Greeks, before falling into the hands of local Yadav rulers.

It is the midpoint on the Kanpur-Delhi Highway.  Historically, it is also known for being a centre of the Revolt of 1857. In ancient times, Etah was called "Aintha" which means 'to respond aggressively' because of the people of the Yadav community, who are very aggressive. It was when the King of Awagarh went hunting in the forest along with his two dogs. The dogs saw a fox and started barking and chasing it. The fox kept on running away trying to protect itself from the King's dogs, but when it reached Etah, the fox responded very aggressively to the King's dogs. The King was surprised by the behavioral change in the fox. So, he thought that this place must have something which made the fleeing fox change its attitude. Therefore, the place was called "Aintha", which later was mispronounced as "Etah". Another story found in Vidya Bharti's book states the old name "Etah" as "Einta" due to a person lost here. In search of water, he dug into the land and his shoe struck a brick ("eint") which leads to the name "Einta" and later this word changed to "Etah".

Geography
It has an average elevation of 170 metres (557 feet).The upper and lower Ganga Canal flow through Etah.

Demographics
As of the 2011 census, Etah's urban agglomeration had a population of 131,023 with 69,446 males and 61,577 females. The literacy rate was 85.62%. 11,786 of the population are of scheduled castes, while 65 are of scheduled tribes. The local languages are Brajbhasha and Kannauji.

Government and politics
Etah city is governed by a type of municipality called the Etah Nagar Palika Parishad. The city covers an area of 13.49 km2 and is divided into 25 wards for the purpose of administration. The municipality is headed by the municipal commissioner or president and represented by one Member of Parliament (MP) in the Lok Sabha, currently Rajveer Singh, and MP Rajya Sabha. The incumbent is Harnath Singh Yadav. The Member of Legislative Assembly (MLA) representing the city is Vipin David.

Civic amenities
The masterplan of the city (1984-2001) was created by the U.P. Town and Country Planning Department. The U.P. Jal Nigam is the body responsible for water supply, and electricity is provided by the Dakshinanchal Vidyut Vitran Nigam Ltd., the southern discom of the Uttar Pradesh state government.

A thermal power project of 1320 MW has been proposed at Malawan, approximately 15 km from Etah, and Ministry of Environment has cleared the project. Land acquisition work has been completed and construction is scheduled to be completed in 2021.

Culture

Etah lies in the cultural region of Braj. Etah is a developing city and has been the district headquarters since British rule. The Padav maidan (open field) is the name of a field used by the army, and every year this field is used for Ram-Lila at Dussehra in the months of September and October and for exhibitions from December to February.

Amir Khusro was born in Patiyali, Kasganj and is considered one of the best poets of Urdu.

Dress
The people of Etah dress in a variety of traditional and Western styles. Traditional styles of dress include colourful draped garments such as sari, dhoti or lungi and tailored clothes such as shalwar kameez and kurta-pyjama. Men often sport head gear like topi or pagri. Sherwani is a more formal male dress and is frequently worn along with chooridar on festive occasions. European-style trousers and shirts are also common.

Food
Etah's food consists of the cuisine prepared in the state of Uttar Pradesh, India. It consists of Mughlai cuisine and both vegetarian and non-vegetarian foods. Dum biryani, kababs, and kormas are some of the dishes made in this region.

Transport

The opening of a railway line in Etah was done by the first president of India, Rajendra Prasad, in 1959, and the train runs from Etah to Tundla. The Etah–Agra Fort Passenger Special started running from Etah to Agra, when railway ministry approved the survey for direct trains to New Delhi, Agra and Aligarh.

Religion
Dargah Hazrat Makhdoom Abdul Ghafur Shah Safvi is situated at the holy gate. Hazrat was the Great Sufi of the silsila e chishtiya and safviya-khadimiya and Haji Mohammad Islam Safvi is the sajjada nashin of dargah sharif at present time..

The 148-year-old Kailash Mandir at Etah was built by King Dil Sukh Rai Bahadur. Noah Kera village was known for marriage of Lord Sri Krishna with Rukmini.. Bhooteshwar is a place for Hindu bodies to be cremated.

Economy
Agriculture and industry are the main source of economy.

Agriculture 
Etah's primary economy is centred around agriculture. The area is situated between Ganga and Yamuna (Doaab) which is highly fertile (Alluvial soil). Farmers harvest three crops each year as irrigation is available year-round. Major agricultural products are rice, wheat, barley, jowar, bajra, and maize, and the soil is also suitable for the cultivation of tobacco.

References

External links
Uttar Pradesh Assembly Elections
Etah Assembly Elections
http://etah.nic.in

 
Cities in Uttar Pradesh